At least two ships of the Brazilian Navy have borne the name Rio Grande do Norte

 , a  launched in 1909 and stricken in 1944
  an  launched in 1944 as USS Strong, acquired by Brazil in 1973 and foundered en route to be scrapped in 1997

Brazilian Navy ship names